Hamdard College of Medicine & Dentistry ( or HCM&D) trains students for the degree of Bachelor of Medicine, Bachelor of Surgery and Bachelor of Dental Surgery. These degrees will be awarded to candidates who successfully complete all requirements set out in the rules and regulations specified by the Pakistan Medical and Dental Council (PMDC). The college is located at the main campus of Hamdard University located in the northern part of Karachi, Pakistan.

Introduction
The college admitted its first M.B B.S batch in 1994 and first B.D.S. batch in 1999. The college has been granted permanent registration by Pakistan Medical and Dental Council. Hamdard College of Medicine & Dentistry is included in the list of permanent members of PMDC under council's ordinance 1962 (Schedule I, III-A and V). The college has been granted recognition by Pakistan Medical Commission for fellowship training in department of General Surgery, Obstetrics & Gynaecology and Operative Dentistry.

Recognition
 Recognised by the Pakistan Medical Commission
 Recognised by the Pakistan Medical and Dental Council.
 Recognised by the Medical Board of California

Clinical training
Clinical training is an important aspect of medical education at this college.

Hamdard University Hospital
Hamdard University Hospital (also referred to as, Taj Medical Complex), a 300-bedded teaching hospital, has Department of Medicine, Surgery, Gynecology & Obstetrics, Otorthinolaryngology, Ophthalmology, Pediatrics, Anesthesiology, Radiology, Orthopedics, Dermatology and Psychiatry.

The hospital is a recognized institution for clinical internship (House Job) offered in Medicine, Surgery, Obstetrics/Gynecology, Pediatrics, Ophthalmology, ENT and Psychiatry. It is also recognized by Pakistan Medical Commission for Fellowship training in General Surgery and Obstetrics & Gynaecology.

Hamdard University Dental Hospital
Hamdard University Dental Hospital is situated in North Nazimabad, Karachi, Pakistan which imparts theoretical and clinical training to students of dentistry. It is also known as Naimat Begum Hamdard University Hospital.

References

External links
Official website

Medical colleges in Sindh
Dental schools in Pakistan
Hamdard University